"Rich Flex" is a song by Canadian rapper Drake and Atlanta-based rapper 21 Savage. It was released on November 4, 2022, as the opening track from their collaborative studio album Her Loss. The song interpolates "Savage" (2020) by Megan Thee Stallion, "24's" (2003) by T.I., and "Red Opps" (2016) by 21 Savage, as well as sampling "I Want You, Girl" (1973) by Sugar and "Nora's Transformation" (1973) by Charles Bernstein. The song spent its first three weeks on the Billboard Hot 100 chart at number two (tying "My Life" as 21 Savage's highest-charting song as a lead artist), blocked from reaching the top spot by Taylor Swift's "Anti-Hero" and peaked at number one on the Canadian Hot 100 chart where it became Drake's eleventh number one single.

Background
On November 3, 2022, the song was announced as part of the tracklist reveal for Her Loss. Shortly after release, the track garnered attention and went viral due to its lyrical content. The track in particular was widely picked out since it features an interpolation of Megan Thee Stallion's "Savage", including writing credits, while another song on the album titled "Circo Loco" sparked controversy as Drake allegedly accused Stallion of lying about the 2020 shooting incident, involving her and rapper Tory Lanez. However, Lil Yachty, who contributed to numerous tracks on Her Loss, confirmed on behalf of Drake that the lyric was in fact about women who lie about getting butt injections (hence the words 'shot' and 'stallion', which is slang for a woman with large buttocks).

Composition
Serving as the "tough, bass-driven" opener for the album, "Rich Flex" sees the two rappers "going back and forth" after a spoken intro performed by rapper Young Nudy. The track starts out with Drake repeatedly asking Savage to do him a favor over a "typically spare Tay Keith beat", while the latter "raps about strip club exploits at Magic City and pistol-whipping an enemy", occasionally imitating the flow of Stallion's "Savage". Similar to their previous collaboration on "Jimmy Cooks", the song makes use of a beat switch over halfway through the track, with Drake riding "a crashing piano beat". The song was seen as a return to "rap-mode" for Drake after having ventured into House music with Honestly, Nevermind (2022).

Critical reception
21 Savage in particular was praised for his appearance on the song. In a track review for the song, Matthew Ritchie at Pitchfork opined that the presence of Savage "makes Drake confront the idea of his own rap mortality" and lets him realize that he cannot "coast on vibe alone" when met with "real skill" alongside his appearance. Rolling Stoness Mosi Reeves pointed out the track for letting the album start out "promisingly", stating that it serves as a "decent introduction that allows [21 Savage] to skate around impropriety". Marcus Shorter of Consequence noted that, by taking turns, the rappers "mirror each other's cadences and rhyme patterns while attacking the same subject matter from slightly different angles".

Charts

Certifications

References

2022 songs
21 Savage songs
Canadian Hot 100 number-one singles
Billboard Global 200 number-one singles
Drake (musician) songs
Song recordings produced by Tay Keith
Songs written by 21 Savage
Songs written by Drake (musician)
Songs written by Tay Keith
Songs written by Vinylz
Song recordings produced by Vinylz